In France, the tribunal correctionnel is the court of first instance that governs in penal matters over offenses classified as misdemeanors and committed by an adult. In 2013, French correctional tribunals rendered 576,859 judgments on action publique, pronounced 501,171 verdicts and homologué 67,983 compositions pénales.

Lesser offenses called contraventions are judged by the Police Tribunal or the juridiction de proximité. More serious wrongdoing such as felonies (crimes) are judged by the cour d'assises.

In terms of judicial organisation, the correctional tribunal is one of the chambers of the tribunal de grande instance. At the largest of these tribunals, several chambers may hear penal matters. Such tribunals number the chambers to distinguish them, and they are referred to as the nth correctional chamber or the nth chamber of the correctional tribunal.

Jurisdiction of the correctional tribunal 
The jurisdiction of a court such as the correctional tribunal is determined either by:
 the matters it judges, 
 the persons it may judge
 the territorial scope of its purview.
Jurisdiction is the first question to be determined by the  when a matter comes before it, so that it knows whether to proceed. If it cannot, it must  file a finding of nul jurisdiction.

Criteria for jurisdiction

Ratione materiæ 
In France, the correctional tribunal is the penal jurisdiction of first instance, and has jurisdiction to judge misdemeanors. In premier ressort, it judges matters that concern the commission of a criminal offence (infraction pénale) considered a délit, similar in severity to a misdemeanor. In French law a misdemeanor is an offense punished by a prison sentence or by a fine of at least 3750 euros. The law sets ten years as the maximum length of a prison sentence for a correctional infraction.

Ratione personnæ 
The correctional tribunal has no jurisdiction over:
 offenses committed by minors (depending on their age and situation one of the juvenile courts would have jurisdiction, or the correctional tribunals for juveniles);
 a misdemeanor committed by the president of the Republic or a member of the government in the exercise of their functions (which would, respectivement, by tried by either the Haute Cour or the Cour de justice de la République, having jurisdiction in such a case).
Beyond these, the correctional tribunal has jurisdiction to judge any other person who has reached the age of majority and has committed an offense. Its jurisdiction extends to co-authors and accomplices, assuming they too have also reached the age of majority. So for example two thieves who acted in concert, are co-authors of the theft, and any sponsor or silent partner is an accomplice by instigation. The three would judged together by the same correctional tribunal assuming they were all adults. If one were a minor, his situation could only be determined by a juvenile court. Any proceedings that concern him would be severed from the correctional tribunal case and take place only within the framework of the juvenile courts. So in some cases a matter might be examined by two different tribunals.

Ratione loci 

Territorial Jurisdiction is defined with respect to:
 the location of the offense;
 the location of the defendant's residence;
 the place of arrest;
 the place of detention (even if detained for some other reason);
 the domicile or residence of the victim in cases of family abandonment.
At least one of these five locations must be located within the territorial limits of the tribunal de grande instance for the correctional tribunal to have jurisdiction to judge the relevant infraction.

Since its latest reform, (réforme), the French judicial map includes 177 correctional tribunals whose assigned territory is that of the tribunal de grande instance of première instance.

Jurisdictional exception 
If the correctional tribunal finds that at least one of the jurisdictional criteria is absent, it must declare its lack of jurisdiction: this means that it must refuse to judge the matter. The jurisdictional exception is an absolute of the public order, which means that even if all parties had agreed to "choose" the  despite the rules of jurisdiction the tribunal has an obligation to declare itself as not having jurisdiction.

Exceptions do exist to the exception of jurisdiction rule: a correctional tribunal which would normally be without jurisdiction may in some cases need to judge a matter that arise in another jurisdiction. When a matter is judged outside of its territorial jurisdiction it is called .

Dépaysement 

 
In some cases, notably good administration of justice, the matter must be judged in another territorial jurisdiction than the one prescribed ratione loci rules.

For reasons of public safety, where there is a risk of serious disturbance of the peace if the trial were held in the competent jurisdiction, the criminal chamber of the court of cassation can refer the matter to a different correctional tribunal. This request can only be made by the procureur général of the Cour de cassation, after he is informed of the difficulty.

In the interest of good administration of justice the criminal chamber of the court of cassation can also order the referral of a case to another tribunal than the one that has territorial jurisdiction (ratione loci), either at the request of the public prosecutor of the Cour de cassation, or of the prosector-general of the Court of Appeal in the jurisdiction where the jurisdiction in question has its seat, either on his own initiative or at the request of the parties. For example, if:

 A magistrate, 
 a lawyer, 
 a public or ministerial official, 
 a member of the gendarmerie nationale, 
 an employee of the national police, customs or penal administration 
 or any other person who holds a position of public authority or who is charged with a mission of public service public, 
 a person who is habitually, by his functions or his mission, in relation with the magistrates or officials of the tribunal correctionnel which has jurisdiction
the procureur of the Court of Appeal that has jurisdiction over the particular correctional tribunal may, d'office, at the request of the procureur of the tribunal correctionnel and at the application of interested parties, transfer the proceeding to the tribunal de grande instance closest to the jurisdiction of the court of appeal, which will then have jurisdiction in the case, par dérogation aux dispositions de compétence territoriale.

Cases exist of material impossibility to hold the trial before the correctional tribunal which normally has jurisdiction. A referral may be ordered by the criminal chamber if the court that would normally have jurisdiction cannot be legally assembled or if the course of justice finds itself otherwise interrupted. A request for referral may be presented, either by the procureur général before the Court of cassation, or by the established ministère public before the jurisdiction in question.

More often, especially in smaller jurisdictions, if the court normally having jurisdiction cannot be composed because , the first president of the cour d'appel can order the matter sent back to a neighboring jurisdiction situated in the scope of that court and designated by a special ordinance passed every year by the first president of the court of appeal indicating for each of its jurisdictions the jurisdiction to which procedures may be sent for this reason.

Correctionnalisation 
A lack of means in the cours d'assises in France allows some defendants to be judged by the correctional tribunal after committing a crime. This is termed correctionnalisation. While illegal, the arrangement often suits both parties; the prosecutor or examining magistrate increases the likelihood of a shorter and simpler trial, while the defendant sees his crime downgraded to a simple misdemeanor-like délit.

Composition 
A French correctional tribunal is composed of:
 three professional judges: a president of the tribunal et deux assessors (Article 398 of the Code de procédure pénale, (Code of Penal Procedure)).
 The ministère public or parquet, represented by the procureur or his representative. Similar to a prosecutor in common law jurisdictions in that he speaks for the community, although the role differs in other ways from jurisdictions where the juge d'instruction does not exist
 the clerk of the 

For the tribunal to sit with one judge only, à juge unique, the possible penalty must be less than five years imprisonment and the matter must concern délits specified by the Code de procédure pénale as traffic offenses (driving while intoxicated for example), or violence resulting in more than eight days of inability to work (incapacité Totale de travail (I.T.T.)) with only one aggravating circumstance. These cases are provided by Article 398-1 of the Code de procédure pénale. Paragraphs 2 and 3 of the same article outline some exceptions having to do with provisional detention and procedure for immediate appearance. In cases of the wrong judge (? -t) article 398-2 provides for a return to the collegial formation because the jurisdictional rules are d'ordre public. Usually, it is the président de la formation collégiale who rules à juge unique.

Sometimes there may be more than three judges if the arguments are expected to be lengthy. One or more additional judges may then attend, because the rule holds that one can only be judged by judges who have heard the arguments. This may pose a problem if one of the judges becomes ill, for example. Only three judges will deliberate the matter, however, regardless of the number who heard it.

Procedure before the correctional tribunal 

The arguments are normally held in public, in open court. If publicity would endanger the order and serenity of the arguments, the dignity of the person or the interests of a third party, the plaintiff or the procureur may at their option request a closed session. This decision will be publicly rendered. (verify:decision to close? )

The president of the tribunal may prohibit the presence of minors, or of certain minors. He can expel any person who disturbs the arguments, including the defendant.

The procedure before a correctional tribunal unfolds in the following order: 
 The president notes the identity of the defendant and outlines the action the tribunal will judge
 If motions of nul jurisdiction have been filed , before the facts of the case are put in evidence, the tribunal theoretically should delve into the incident in depth and deliberate simultaneously on the procedural questions and on the acts with which the defendant is reproached, except if the points raised before a defense is made might play on the outcome of the proceedings. A judgement will be rendered.
 Interrogation of the defendant
 Argument of the plaintiff
 The ministère public asks for a sentence
 Argument of the defendant's lawyer (if the defendant has chosen to hire a lawyer)
 The last word goes to the defendant.
After the arguments the prosecutor presents the government's demand for a sentence (réquisitoire oral). He summarizes the elements of culpability and may advocate a penalty for the defendant. His proposal does not obligate the tribunal; it is an opinion in consultation, given the same weight as the argument of the defense attorney.

See also 
 —appeal court jurisdiction for some French overseas territories
 International Criminal Court
 International Court of Justice
 Judiciary of France
 Law codes in civil law and common law jurisdictions
 Civil law
 Common law
 Court of Appeal (France)—Court of Appeal in France. Differs considerably from appeals process in common law countries, in particular, certain types of court cases are appealed to courts called something other than "court of appeal"
 Court of Appeal, Court of Appeals, Cour d'appel—redirect to Appellate court, the courts of second instance and appeals process in common law countries, which differs considerably from French appeal process
 Court of Cassation - general discussion, does not mention France, but lists other examples of this type of court
 Court of Cassation (France) - highest judicial court of appeal in France, differs considerably from common law jurisdictions
 French criminal law, a sector of French law, and of the branches of the juridical system of the French Republic
 Crime - in common law jurisdictions, a criminal offense, an illegal act. In French law, has a much more limited meaning, closer to felony - a serious offense punishable by a penalty of more than 10 years imprisonment. A délit, which roughly corresponds to a misdemeanor, is a breach of French criminal law (droit pénal) but not a crime under French law.
 Criminal responsibility in French law
 Delict - general discussion of this term in civil law jurisdictions.
  - in French law, can be either a misdemeanor (delit penal) or delit civil
 Ministère public - shares some but not all characteristics of the prosecutor in common law jurisdictions. In France the procureur is considered a magistrate, for one thing, and investigation is typically carried out by a juge d'instruction.

Filmography 
 Raymond Depardon, 10e chambre, instants d'audience (documentary film)
 Jean-Luc Léon, Pacifique Justice (televised documentary on the Tribunal de première instance in Papeete)

Notes and references 
Notes

citations

Courts in France
Criminal law legal terminology
Criminal law by country
Society of France
Tribunals